Catephia albifasciata is a species of moth of the family Erebidae. It is found in Zimbabwe.

References

Catephia
Moths described in 1968
Moths of Africa